Çatak is a village in the Altınyayla District of Burdur Province in Turkey. Its population is 554 (2021).

References

Villages in Altınyayla District, Burdur